The 1999–00 National League 2 North was the thirteenth full season of rugby union within the fourth tier (north) of the English league system, and the last until 2009-10 to use the name National League 2 North.  It is counterpart to National League 2 South, which covers the southern half of the country.

Kendal finished the season as champions, 5 points clear of second placed Stourbridge, to gain the only promotion spot to the 2000–01 National Division 2 (former National League 1).  It was the second year in a row that Stourbridge had to be content with the runners up spot.  At the other end of the table, Sheffield were the only side to be relegated, only winning 3 games and finishing 5 points adrift of safety.  Sheffield would drop to Midlands 1.  The reason National League 2 North only had one relegation place compared to National League 2 South (who had two) was that both of the two teams relegated from the division above were based in the south of the country, requiring more places to accommodate for their arrival the following season.

Structure

Each team played home and away matches against each of the other teams, playing a total of twenty-six matches each. The league champions were promoted to National Division 2 while the bottom side dropped to either North 1 or Midlands depending on locality.

Participating teams and locations

League table

Sponsorship
National League 2 North is part of the Jewson National Leagues and is sponsored by Jewson.

References

N4
National League 2 North